Khaber-e Jonub ( lit. "The South News") is a daily newspaper published in Shiraz, Iran.

External links
 Official website

Newspapers published in Iran
Mass media in Shiraz
Persian-language newspapers
Publications with year of establishment missing